Buona Vista College is a school located in Rumassala, Unawatuna, Galle in Southern Sri Lanka. The school was founded in 1848 and later was upgraded as a high school in 1869. Notable past pupils of this school includes Martin Wickramasinghe, Maumoon Abdul Gayoom, Senarath Paranavithana, A.T. Ariyaratne and Arisen Ahubudu.

References

External links
 College Website

Schools in Galle
Educational institutions established in 1848
1848 establishments in Ceylon